Dwight Holden Okita (born August 26, 1958) is a Japanese-American novelist, poet, and playwright. His work reflects his experiences as a third-generation Japanese-American (sansei), a gay man, and a Nichiren Buddhist. He studied English literature at the University of Illinois, Chicago. His first book of poems, Crossing with the Light, was published in 1992, and nominated for Best Asian Literature Book of 1993. His plays include Salad Bowl Dance, commissioned in 1993 by the Chicago Historical Society; Richard Speck, commissioned in 1991 by the American Blues Theater; and The Rainy Season, produced in 1993. His novels include The Hope Store (2017) and THE PROSPECT OF MY ARRIVAL (2011) which was a finalist in the Amazon Breakthrough Novel Awards. He won a Joseph Jefferson Award in 1996 for the collaborative play The Radiance of a Thousand Suns, which he wrote with Anne McGravie, Nicholas Patricca, and David Zak.

References

External links
The Dwight Okita website

American male poets
American male novelists
American male dramatists and playwrights
American dramatists and playwrights
American dramatists and playwrights of Japanese descent
American novelists of Asian descent
American poets of Asian descent
American gay writers
American LGBT novelists
American LGBT poets
American LGBT dramatists and playwrights
American writers of Japanese descent
Living people
American LGBT people of Asian descent
1958 births
21st-century LGBT people
Gay poets